Candidianus (c. 296–313) was the son of the Roman Emperor Galerius and adoptive son of Galeria Valeria, the wife of Galerius and daughter of Diocletian.

Life and execution 
Candidianus was the son of Galerius and a concubine whose name has not been recorded. He was later adopted by Galerius's legitimate wife, Galeria Valeria, who had no children of her own. Lactantius records that Galerius intended to make Candidianus a Caesar, or junior emperor, upon the celebration of his vicennalia in 312. However, Galerius perished in 311 while preparations for the celebration were underway and was succeeded by Maximinus Daza and Licinius.

Along with Severianus, son of the deceased emperor Severus II, Candidianus feared the intentions of Licinius and fled to the court of Maximinus Daza where he resided until 313. It was probably about this time that young Candidianus was betrothed to the daughter of Daza who was seven years old at the time.

When Daza went to war against Licinius in 313, Candidianus was captured after Licinius emerged victorious and Daza perished. According to Lactantius, Candidianus presented himself at the court of Licinius and was received with honor. However, as soon as the youth felt himself safe, Licinius had him executed. His unnamed betrothed and her brother, Maximus, also lost their lives.

References

Sources
 Lactantius. Lord Hailes (transl.) (2021) On the Deaths of the Persecutors: A Translation of De Mortibus Persecutorum by Lucius Cæcilius Firmianus Lactantius Evolution Publishing, Merchantville, NJ , p. 91
 Mackay, Christopher S. “Lactantius and the Succession to Diocletian.” Classical Philology, vol. 94, no. 2, 1999, pp. 198–209. JSTOR. Accessed 15 May 2021.
 Leadbetter, William Lewis. Galerius and the Will of Diocletian. United Kingdom, Taylor & Francis, 2009.

313 deaths
4th-century Romans
People executed by the Roman Empire
Executed ancient Roman people
Tetrarchy
Sons of Roman emperors
Illegitimate children of Roman emperors
Year of birth uncertain